The Ndula Hydroelectric Power Station is a  hydroelectric power station on the Thika River in Kenya.

Location
The coordinates of the power station are: 1°01'35.0"S, 37°14'36.0"E (Latitude:-1.026384; Longitude:37.243335).

Overview
Ndula Power Station was commissioned in 1924. It has two horizontal Francis turbines, driving two generators. It is owned and operated by Kenya Electricity Generating Company.

Ownership
Ndula Hydroelectric Power Station is 100 percent owned by Kenya Electricity Generating Company, a parastatal company of the government of Kenya.

See also

List of power stations in Kenya

References

External links
Website of Kenya Electricity Generating Company

Hydroelectric power stations in Kenya
Dams in Kenya
Dams completed in 1924
Energy infrastructure completed in 1924
Kiambu County